Dead Man Out is a 1989 American crime film directed by Richard Pearce and written by Ron Hutchinson. The film stars Danny Glover, Rubén Blades, Larry Block, Tom Atkins and Samuel L. Jackson. The film premiered on HBO on March 12, 1989.

Plot

Cast 
Danny Glover as Dr. Alex Marsh
Rubén Blades as Ben
Larry Block as Kleinfeld
Tom Atkins as Berger
Samuel L. Jackson as Calvin Fredricks

Home media
The film was released on VHS by HBO Video under license from Home Box Office. However, it never released on DVD or Blu-ray.

References

External links
 

1989 television films
1989 films
American crime films
1980s crime films
HBO Films films
Films directed by Richard Pearce
Films scored by Cliff Eidelman
1980s English-language films
1980s American films